Rohanixalus shyamrupus, also known as the hornbill bubble-nest frog and Shyamrup's bush frog, is a species of frog in the family Rhacophoridae endemic to north-eastern India: it is only known from the type locality, Namdapha Tiger Reserve in Arunachal Pradesh. 

Formerly described in Chirixalus, it was moved to the new genus Rohanixalus in 2020 following a phylogenetic study.

Its natural habitats are subtropical or tropical moist lowland forests, subtropical or tropical moist shrubland, swamps, freshwater marshes, and intermittent freshwater marshes.
It is threatened by habitat loss.

References

Rohanixalus
Frogs of India
Endemic fauna of India
Amphibians described in 1989
Taxonomy articles created by Polbot